Lycodon zoosvictoriae is a species of wolf snake. It was discovered in Cambodia in June 2014.

References

zawi
Reptiles described in 2014
Reptiles of Cambodia
Endemic fauna of Cambodia